This is a list of TCP and UDP port numbers used by protocols for operation of network applications.
The Transmission Control Protocol (TCP) and the User Datagram Protocol (UDP) only need one port for duplex, bidirectional traffic. They usually use port numbers that match the services of the corresponding TCP or UDP implementation, if they exist.

The Internet Assigned Numbers Authority (IANA) is responsible for maintaining the official assignments of port numbers for specific uses. However, many unofficial uses of both well-known and registered port numbers occur in practice. Similarly, many of the official assignments refer to protocols that were never or are no longer in common use. This article lists port numbers and their associated protocols that have experienced significant uptake.

Table legend

Well-known ports

The port numbers in the range from 0 to 1023 (0 to 210 − 1) are the well-known ports or system ports. They are used by system processes that provide widely used types of network services. On Unix-like operating systems, a process must execute with superuser privileges to be able to bind a network socket to an IP address using one of the well-known ports.

Registered ports

The range of port numbers from 1024 to 49151 (210 to 214 + 215 − 1) are the registered ports. They are assigned by IANA for specific service upon application by a requesting entity. On most systems, registered ports can be used without superuser privileges.

Dynamic, private or ephemeral ports

The range 49152–65535 (215 + 214 to 216 − 1) contains dynamic or private ports that cannot be registered with IANA. This range is used for private or customized services, for temporary purposes, and for automatic allocation of ephemeral ports.

Note

See also
 Port (computer networking)
 Internet protocol suite
 List of IP numbers
 Lists of network protocols
 Comparison of file transfer protocols

References and notes

Further reading

External links
 

Computing-related lists
 
Internet-related lists
Lists of network protocols